Adult Attachment Disorder (AAD) develops in adults as the result of an attachment disorder, or Reactive Attachment Disorder, that goes untreated in childhood. It begins with children who were not allowed proper relationships with parents or guardians early in their youth, or were abused by an adult in their developmental stages in life. According to attachment theory, causes and symptoms of the disorder are rooted in human relationships over the course of one's lifetime, and how these relationships developed and functioned. Symptoms typically focus around neglect, dysfunction, abuse, and trust issues in all forms of their relationships. These symptoms are similar to those of other attachment disorders, but focus more on relationships later in life rather than those in earlier years. To be considered to have AAD, you must demonstrate at least 2-3 of its symptoms. These symptoms include: impulsiveness, desire for control, lack of trust, lack of responsibility, and addiction. While the DSM-5 does not recognize it as an official disorder, Adult Attachment disorder is currently being studied by several groups and treatment is being developed. Some of these studies suggest splitting AAD into two groups, avoidance and anxious/ambivalent. More recent and advanced medical practice advocates for four categorisations;
Secure: Low on avoidance, low on anxiety.
Avoidant: High on avoidance, low on anxiety.
Anxious: Low on avoidance, high on anxiety.
Anxious and Avoidant: High on avoidance, high on anxiety.

Symptoms and specifics 
Adult Attachment Disorder develops when an attachment disorder, such as Reactive Attachment Disorder, goes untreated in youth and continues into adulthood. Symptoms are no longer the same as in childhood, but are significantly similar. Some researchers have begun to suggest that this is because adult relationships are similar to the relationship between infants and caregivers in that they are a type of attachment. Similarities between the two types of relationships include, but are not limited to, a feeling of safety when in proximity to a partner, close contact, shared interest and preoccupation with each other, and "baby talk".

While there are similarities to other attachment disorders, Adult Attachment Disorder is starting to be recognized as a disease in its own right due to symptoms not present in other attachment disorders, such as greater likelihood of addiction, impulsiveness, behaviors that are socially negative or inappropriate, desire for control, trust issues, unwillingness to accept responsibility, helplessness, anxiety, superficial positivity, obsessive compulsive disorder, and depression.

The DSM-5 does not recognize Adult Attachment Disorder per se, but research on it continues and therapies for it have been proposed. There are different levels of severity of the disorder. All of them could benefit from therapy. Many therapies have been claimed to at least partially treat this disorder. Some are meant for prevent disorders, mostly in families that have already experienced the disorder. Other therapies include outpatient, residential and wilderness therapy. Most of the therapies emphasize effective communication and problem-solving strategies. They also focus on finding the roots of the attachment that most likely evolved in early childhood. One of these is a controversial treatment known as attachment holding or "in arms" treatment. This therapy is based on the theory that a child must release their frustration with caregivers before they are able to trust them.

References

Attachment theory
Stress-related disorders